Vallée Enchantée (foaled 27 March 2000) is a retired thoroughbred racehorse bred in Ireland and trained in France. She won Hong Kong Vase and two group races in 2003. A very small horse, she weighed 813 pounds when she won the Hong Kong Vase.

References 
Racing stats at France Galop Racing Post
pedigree and partial racing stats

2000 racehorse births
Thoroughbred family 19-b
Racehorses bred in Ireland
Racehorses trained in France